NA-174 Rahim Yar Khan-VI is a constituency for the National Assembly of Pakistan.

Election 2002 

General elections were held on 10 Oct 2002. Jahangir Khan Tareen of PML-Q won by 38,964 votes.

Election 2008 

General elections were held on 18 Feb 2008. Jahangir Khan Tareen of PML-F won by 84,577 votes.

Election 2013 

General elections were held on 11 May 2013. Makhdoom Syed Mustafa Mehmood of PPP won by 97,778 votes and became the  member of National Assembly.

Election 2018 

General elections are scheduled to be held on 25 July 2018.

See also
NA-173 Rahim Yar Khan-V
NA-175 Kot Addu

References

External links 
Election result's official website

NA-154